is a Japanese short track speed skater. She competed in the women's 3000 metre relay event at the 1992 Winter Olympics.

References

1976 births
Living people
Japanese female short track speed skaters
Olympic short track speed skaters of Japan
Short track speed skaters at the 1992 Winter Olympics
Sportspeople from Nagano Prefecture
20th-century Japanese women